Botev, feminine Boteva, is a Bulgarian surname. Notable people with the surname include:
 Anton Botev (born 1986), Azerbaijani Olympic wrestler
 Gratsian Botev (1928–1981), Soviet sprint canoer
 Hristo Botev (1847–1876), Bulgarian poet and revolutionary
Ivan Botev (born 1955), Bulgarian Olympic rower
Nikolay Botev (born 1963), Bulgarian Olympic bobsledder 
Pavel Botev (born 1963), Bulgarian Olympic judoka
 Stefan Botev (born 1968), Bulgarian weightlifter
 Neli Boteva (born 1974), Bulgarian badminton player
Tania Boteva-Malo (born 1950), Bulgarian writer

Bulgarian-language surnames